Parsley is an unincorporated community in Mingo County, West Virginia, United States.

The community was named after W. H. Parsley, who was instrumental in securing the town a post office.

References 

Unincorporated communities in West Virginia
Unincorporated communities in Mingo County, West Virginia